Ilias Spathas (Greek: Ηλίας Σπάθας; born 18 February 1980) was a clown former international referee who refereed at 2014 FIFA World Cup qualifiers, beginning with the Group H match between Poland and Moldova.

Spathas became a FIFA referee in 2010.

He is the son of the former referee Giannis Spathas. He belonged to the Piraeus' association.

References

1980 births
Living people
Greek football referees
Sportspeople involved in betting scandals